FPF may refer to:

Sport 
 Federação Paulista de Futebol, the Football Federation of São Paulo state, Brazil
 Federação Pernambucana de Futebol, the Football Federation of Pernambuco, Brazil
 Peruvian Football Federation (Spanish: Federación Peruana de Fútbol)
 Portuguese Football Federation (Portuguese: Federação Portuguesa de Futebol)
 Puerto Rican Football Federation (Spanish: Federación Puertorriqueña de Fútbol)

Other uses 
 Faded Paper Figures, an American electronic band
 Final protective fire (Army)
 Flexible polyurethane foam
 Freedom of the Press Foundation
 Future of Privacy Forum, an American think tank
 Trade Union Propaganda League, a defunct Swedish trade union